Basketball at the 1997 Southeast Asian Games was held from 12 to 18 October 1997 in Senayan, Central Jakarta, Indonesia. This edition featured both tournaments for men's and women's team. All matches were held in Senayan Basketball Sports Hall.

The Philippines were able to defend their title by defeating their round robin dementors and last edition's bronze medallists Malaysia in the championship match, 96–86, for their fourth consecutive title since 1991 and their 10th overall title. Meanwhile, last edition's silver medallists Thailand was relegated to third place after besting the hosts Indonesia, 68–57.

In the women's event, Malaysia reclaimed the championship by defeating the defending champions Thailand, 67–58 for their ninth overall title. Indonesia, meanwhile, salvaged the solitary podium finish by pulling a miraculous come-from-behind 68–65 win against the Philippines for the bronze.

Tournament format
The competition format for both men's and women's event calls for the top two teams after the single round robin to face in the championship match, whereas third and fourth-place finishers per division will playoff for the bronze medal.

Men's tournament

Participating nations

Results

Bronze medal match

Gold medal match

Women's tournament

Participating nations

Bronze medal match

Gold medal match

References

1997
1997 Southeast Asian Games events
1997–98 in Asian basketball
International basketball competitions hosted by Indonesia